André Cusaco (born in Ireland) was a colonial administrator at the service of Portugal.

He was appointed governor of Rio de Janeiro on August 29, 1694, replacing the prior holder of the office, António Pais de Sande, who had suffered a stroke.

References

Portuguese politicians
Date of death unknown
Portuguese colonial governors and administrators
17th-century politicians
Year of birth unknown